Quantum Leap is an American television series that first aired on NBC from March 26, 1989 to May 5, 1993. The series was created by Donald P. Bellisario, and starred Scott Bakula and Dean Stockwell. This list is in chronological order of broadcasts with 97 episodes produced.

Series overview

Episodes

Season 1 (1989)

Season 2 (1989–90)

Season 3 (1990–91)

Season 4 (1991–92)

Season 5 (1992–93)

Ratings

References

External links
 

Lists of American science fiction television series episodes
Quantum Leap
Episodes